Dylan Michael Sage (born 24 January 1992) is a South African rugby union player for the  in Super Rugby, the  in the Currie Cup and the  in the Rugby Challenge.

He was a member of the South African Sevens team that won a bronze medal at the 2016 Summer Olympics.

Rugby career

Force
However, he failed to make any appearances at Super Rugby level, but did play in the 2014 Pacific Rugby Cup with the Western Force A side.

South Africa Sevens
In late 2015, Sage was contracted by the South African Rugby Union to join the South Africa Sevens team. He was named as a member of extended training squad for the side prepared as they for 2016 Summer Olympics He was called in as injury cover for the 2015 South Africa Sevens and subsequently included in the final squad for the event.

2016 Summer Olympics
Sage was included in a 12-man squad for the 2016 Summer Olympics in Rio de Janeiro. He was named as a substitute for their first match in Group B of the competition against Spain, with South Africa winning the match 24–0.

Personal life
Sage is the grandson of Doug Hopwood, a rugby player that represented the South Africa national rugby union team in 22 test matches between 1961 and 1965. His younger brother Jarryd is also a professional rugby union player.

References

External links
 
 

1992 births
Alumni of Wynberg Boys' High School
Living people
Medalists at the 2016 Summer Olympics
Olympic bronze medalists for South Africa
Olympic medalists in rugby sevens
Olympic rugby sevens players of South Africa
Rugby sevens players at the 2018 Commonwealth Games
Rugby sevens players at the 2016 Summer Olympics
South Africa international rugby sevens players
South African rugby union players
Sportspeople from Cape Town
US Montauban players
Blue Bulls players
Bulls (rugby union) players